Senator Scott may refer to:

Members of the United States Senate
Hugh Scott (1900–1994), U.S. Senator from Pennsylvania from 1959 to 1977
John Scott (Pennsylvania politician, born 1824) (1824–1896), U.S. Senator from Pennsylvania from 1869 to 1875
Nathan B. Scott (1842–1924), U.S. Senator from West Virginia from 1899 to 1911
Rick Scott (born 1952), U.S. Senator from Florida since 2019
Tim Scott (born 1965), U.S. Senator from South Carolina since 2013
W. Kerr Scott (1896–1958), U.S. Senator from North Carolina from 1954 to 1958
William L. Scott (1915–1997), U.S. Senator from Virginia from 1973 to 1979

United States state senate members
Abram M. Scott (1785–1833), Mississippi State Senate
Allen D. Scott (1831–1897), New York State Senate
Bobby Scott (politician) (born 1947), Virginia State Senate
Charles Frederick Scott (1860–1938), Kansas State Senate
Charles Scott (Wyoming politician) (born 1945), Wyoming State Senate
David Scott (Georgia politician) (born 1946), Georgia State Senate
Delbert Lee Scott (born 1949), Missouri State Senate
Eva Mae Fleming Scott (1926–2019), Virginia State Senate
Frank D. Scott (1878–1951), Michigan State Senate
George E. Scott (1860–1915), Wisconsin State Senate
George G. Scott (1811–1886), New York State Senate
George W. Scott (politician) (born 1937), Washington State Senate
I. Grant Scott (1897–1964), New Jersey State Senate
Jack Scott (California politician) (born 1933), California State Senate
John B. Scott (1789–1854), New York State Senate
John E. Scott (born 1939), Missouri State Senate
John L. Scott Jr. (born 1953), South Carolina State Senate
John Morin Scott (1730–1784), New York State Senate
John P. Scott (1933–2010), New Jersey State Senate
John Scott (Iowa politician) (1824–1903), Iowa State Senate
Martha G. Scott (born 1935), Michigan State Senate
Phil Scott (politician) (born 1958), Vermont State Senate
Randy Scott (politician) (1946–2015), South Carolina State Senate
Ray Scott (Colorado politician), Colorado State Senate
Thomas B. Scott (1829–1886), Wisconsin State Senate
Tom Scott (politician) (born 1958), Connecticut State Senate
Walter F. Scott (1856–1938), Vermont State Senate
Z. D. Scott (1846–1922), South Dakota State Senate